The Walter Minor 12 was a 12-cylinder, air-cooled, V engine for aircraft use built in Czechoslovakia by Walter Aircraft Engines in the late-1930s.

Design and development
Sharing the bore and stroke dimensions of the Walter Minor and the layout of the Sagitta this engine was first run in 1937. It appeared at the Paris Air Show in 1938 along with other engines from the Walter range.  The engine passed a type test in January 1939 and was considered for an unproduced aircraft project, the Polish RWD 22, but due to the outbreak of World War II development and production of this engine did not continue.

Applications
RWD 22 (intended)

Specifications (Minor 12 I-MR)

See also

References

 Němeček, Václav. Československá letadla I (1918-1945) (Czechoslovak Aircraft I (1918-1945)). Third edition, Naše vojsko, Prague. 1983.

Minor 12
1930s aircraft piston engines